Buhen ( Bohón) was an ancient Egyptian settlement situated on the West bank of the Nile below (to the North of) the Second Cataract in what is now Northern State, Sudan. Buhen, as a settlement was established during the Old Kingdom (2686-2181 BCE), but the fortress which Buhen is famous for was not established until the Middle Kingdom (2055-1650 BCE). During the Old Kingdom, Buhen was primarily used to smelt copper, until the Middle Kingdom, when the site was used by Egyptians to maintain the new southern border of Egypt. 

It is now submerged in Lake Nasser, Sudan; as a result of the International Campaign to Save the Monuments of Nubia, many of its antiquities were moved to the National Museum of Sudan in Khartoum. On the East bank, across the river, there was another ancient settlement, where the town of Wadi Halfa now stands. The earliest mention of Buhen comes from stelae dating to the reign of Senusret I. Buhen is also the earliest known Egyptian settlement in the land of Nubia.

History of Buhen 
In the Old Kingdom (about 2686–2181 BCE), there was an Egyptian colonial town at Buhen, that was also used for copper working. An archaeological investigation in 1962 revealed what was described as an ancient copper factory. This was surrounded by a massive though crude stone wall. And further evidence point to the colony having been supplied from the north. The settlement may have been established during the reign of Sneferu, of the 4th Dynasty. Nevertheless, there is evidence of earlier, 2nd Dynasty, occupation at Buhen.

Graffiti and other inscribed items from the site show that the Egyptians stayed about 200 years, until late in the 5th Dynasty, when they were probably forced out by immigration from the south.

In the Middle Kingdom (2055-1650 BCE), the fortress at Buhen was established. The physical geography of Buhen worked in the benefit of the fortress. The large rock wall provided a strong preliminary base for the construction of the fortress. During the Middle Kingdom, the majority of people occupying Buhen were Egyptians who were directed South from Lower Egypt, and cycled through.

Following the Middle Kingdom, came the Second-Intermediate Period. With the Second-Intermediate Period came the Funerary Stele of Sebek-dedu and Sebek-em-heb. The excavation of the stele produced a new understanding of the annexation of Nubia at the site of Buhen. The stele iterates that the Egyptians that had gained control over Buhen had been dependent on Nubian kings in achieving this.

Fortress 
Buhen is known for its large fortress, probably constructed during the rule of Senusret III in around 1860 BCE (12th Dynasty). Senusret III conducted four campaigns into Kush and established a line of forts within signaling distance of one another; Buhen was the northernmost of these. The other forts along the banks were Mirgissa, Shalfak, Uronarti, Askut, Dabenarti, Semna, and Kumma. The Kushites captured Buhen during the 13th Dynasty, and held it until Ahmose I recaptured it at the beginning of the 18th Dynasty. It was stormed and recaptured by indigenous forces at the end of Egypt's 20th Dynasty.

One of the contributing factors for the creation of the fortress in Buhen was the goal of annexing Nubia. Both Senusret I and Senusret III dedicated much of their reign to campaigning into Nubia, in an attempt to extend the boundaries of Egypt. In doing so, the two kings built the fortress in Buhen, along with the other fortresses around the 2nd cataract. These fortresses established a new border for Upper Egypt.

The fortress itself extended more than  along the west bank of the Nile. It covered , and had within its wall a small town laid out in a grid system. At its peak it probably had a population of around 3,500 people. The fortress also included the administration for the whole fortified region of the Second Cataract. Its fortifications included a moat three meters deep, drawbridges, bastions, buttresses, ramparts, battlements, loopholes, and a catapult. The outer wall included an area between the two walls pierced with a double row of arrow loops, allowing both standing and kneeling archers to fire at the same time. The walls of Buhen were crafted with rough stone. The walls of Buhen are unique as most Egyptian fortress walls were constructed with timber and mud-brick. The fortress at Buhen is now submerged under Lake Nasser as a result of the construction of the Aswan Dam in 1964. Before the site was covered with water, it was excavated by a team led by Walter Bryan Emery.

Buhen had a temple of Horus built by Hatshepsut, which was moved to the National Museum of Sudan in Khartoum prior to the flooding of Lake Nasser.

Copper work at Buhen 
During 1962, an archaeological expedition of Buhen took place revealing a copper factory. During the excavation an unknown ore was found and analyzed further using modern techniques. The ore was originally made up of malachite however has become atacamite mixed with gold. With many factors going into a location being adequate for copper smelting, Buhen would have been an ideal location to produce small quantities of copper. An Egyptian device called, "Fire Dogs," were used to generally prepare food. The exact usage of a fire dog is not known however, there is evidence that fire dogs involved fire and burning. A large number of fire dogs were found a Buhen, this discovery has been associated with the potential generation of copper by using fire dogs. After the copper had been smelted, it is likely that it was used for household and agricultural tools, from household knives to hoes for farming.

In order for a copper to be smelted in an area certain resources were necessary, and the availability of these resources determined if an area was suitable to copper smelting. These resources included human labor, water, clay, wood, a mineral-based flux, and large quantities of the ore. The mineral-based flux would be used to produce fluid slag during smelting. With Buhen's geographical location, during the time of the Old Kingdom, it would have met all of the requirements for a successful copper smelting location. Buhen is close in proximity to the Nile river, which would have provided the necessary supply water as well as clay. With Egypt having a many skilled workers, a sufficient amount of the skilled workers necessary could have been brought to Buhen. Although now there is not much evidence of sufficient timber, during the Old Kingdom a higher level of rainfall would have resulted in a larger availability of timber along the Nile and Wadis. The slags stemming from the factory contain iron, indicative of  a ferruginous flux. This specific flux requires iron oxide, which is abundant throughout the Nile valley. Despite evidence for the majority of the requirements, when it comes to the copper that would have been used for smelting not much is known about the source. All copper deposits recorded in Egypt and in Northern Sudan are long from Buhen. All of these deposits are also located on the eastern side of the Nile, which poses further complications in transporting the copper that would have been smelted as it would have had to cross the Nile.

See also
 List of ancient Egyptian towns and cities

Gallery

Notes

External links 
 Historic Photographs and 3D Reconstruction Video
Brian Yare, The Middle Kingdom Egyptian Fortresses in Nubia. 2001
3D reconstruction of the Buhen fortress

Buildings and structures completed in the 19th century BC
Archaeological sites in Egypt
Former populated places in Egypt
History of Nubia
 
19th-century BC establishments in Egypt